The 1976 Brown Bears football team was an American football team that represented Brown University during the 1976 NCAA Division I football season. Brown tied for first place in the Ivy League, its first conference championship. 

In their fourth season under head coach John Anderson, the Bears compiled a 8–1 record and outscored opponents 171 to 102. Scott Nelson and Mike Prairie were the team captains. 

The Bears' 6–1 conference record tied for best in the Ivy League standings. They outscored Ivy opponents 140 to 84.  Brown was named co-champion despite having defeated the other 6–1 team, Yale.

Brown played its home games at Brown Stadium in Providence, Rhode Island.

Schedule

References

Brown
Brown Bears football seasons
Ivy League football champion seasons
Brown Bears football